Space shogi is a three-dimensional shogi variant invented by George R. Dekle Sr. in 1987. The gamespace comprises nine 9×9 shogi boards stacked vertically. Each player controls a standard set of shogi pieces.

Space shogi was included in World Game Review No. 10 edited by Michael Keller.

Game rules 
Space shogi follows standard shogi conventions, including the same types and numbers of pieces, and a similar initial setup. All the normal shogi rules apply, including drops, promotion, check, checkmate, and impasse. But pieces have the freedom of three-dimensional movement.

Starting setup 
Black starts the game occupying levels 1 through 3; White starts on levels 9 through 7.

See also 
 Three-dimensional chess
 Also by George Dekle:
 Hexshogi – a variant with hexagonal cells
 Trishogi – a variant with triangular cells
 Masonic shogi – a variant with standard cells but staggered ranks

References 

Bibliography
 
 

Board games introduced in 1987
Abstract strategy games
Shogi variants